Coriocella safagae is a species of small sea snail with a transparent internal shell, a marine gastropod mollusk in the family Velutinidae. Because the shell is mostly internal, the snail resembles a sea slug in general appearance.

References

External links
 

Velutinidae
Gastropods described in 1999